The spotted corydoras, longnose corydoras or Agassiz's catfish (Corydoras ambiacus) is a tropical freshwater fish belonging to the subfamily Corydoradinae of the family Callichthyidae. It originates in inland waters in South America and is found in the upper Amazon River basin in Brazil, Colombia and Peru.

The fish will grow in length up to 1.9 inches (4.9 centimeters). It lives in a tropical climate in water with a 6.0 – 8.0 pH, a water hardness of 2 – 25 dGH, and a temperature range of 70 – 75 °F (21 – 24 °C). It feeds on worms, benthic crustaceans, insects, and plant matter.

The spotted corydoras is of commercial importance in the aquarium trade industry.

See also
 List of freshwater aquarium fish species

References 

 

Corydoras
Fish described in 1872